Synaptocochlea is a genus of very small sea snails, marine gastropod mollusks in the family Trochidae, the top snails.

Description
The oval shell is intermediate between Stomatella and Gena in contour. The very short spire is sub-marginal. The surface is spirally striated or decussated. The very large aperture is longer than wide. The animal has an operculum.

Distribution
This marine genus occurs in the tropical Indo-West Pacific, Indo-Malaysia, Oceania and off Australia (Northern Territory, Queensland, Western Australia)

Species
Species within the genus Synaptocochlea include:
 Synaptocochlea asperulata (A. Adams, 1850)
 Synaptocochlea belmonti Simone, 2009
 Synaptocochlea caliginosa H. & A. Adams, 1863
 Synaptocochlea concinna (Gould, 1845)
 Synaptocochlea granosa (Lambert, 1874)
 Synaptocochlea montrouzieri (Pilsbry, 1890)
 Synaptocochlea picta (d’Orbigny, 1847)
 Synaptocochlea pulchella (A. Adams, 1850)
 Synaptocochlea stellata (Souverbie, 1863)

The Indo-Pacific Molluscan Database also mentions the following species 
 Synaptocochlea hexagonum Philippi, 1850
 Synaptocochlea tursicus Reeve, 1848

 Species brought into synonymy
 Synaptocochlea inconcinna auct. non Pilsbry, 1921: synonym of Synaptocochlea picta (d’Orbigny, 1847)
 Synaptocochlea lactea Usticke, 1959: synonym of Synaptocochlea picta (d’Orbigny, 1847)
 Synaptocochlea nigrita Rehder, 1939: synonym of Synaptocochlea picta (d’Orbigny, 1847)
 Synaptocochlea picta (Montrouzier in Souverbie & Montrouzier, 1862): synonym of Synaptocochlea montrouzieri (Pilsbry, 1890)

References

 Vaught, K.C. (1989). A classification of the living Mollusca. American Malacologists: Melbourne, FL (USA). . XII, 195 pp.

External links
 Pilsbry, H. A. (1890-1891). Manual of conchology, structural and systematic, with illustrations of the species. Ser. 1. Vol. 12: Stomatellidae, Scissurellidae, Pleurotomariidae, Haliotidae, Scutellinidae, Addisoniidae, Cocculinidae, Fissurellidae. pp 1-323, pls 1-65. Philadelphia, published by the Conchological Section, Academy of Natural Sciences.

 
Trochidae
Gastropod genera